Georg Patermann (c. 1580 – after 1628) was a German composer and organist at St. Jakobi in Rostock and the Schloßkirche Güstrow.

Two wedding motets survive: Quam pulchrae sunt mammae tuae (1610) and Sponsa velut Christo juncta est Ecclesia Sponso (1619)

References

1580s births
1620s deaths
Year of birth uncertain
Year of death uncertain
17th-century German composers
German organists
German male organists
17th-century male musicians